Peter Alfred Ziegler (2 November 1928 – 19 July 2013) was a Swiss geologist, who made contributions to the understanding of the geological evolution of Europe and the North Atlantic borderlands, of intraplate tectonics and of plate tectonic controls on the evolution and hydrocarbon potential of sedimentary basins. Ziegler's career consists of 33 years as exploration geologist with the petroleum industry, 30 of which with Shell, and 20 years of university teaching and research.

Life and work
Born in Winterthur, Ziegler took a PhD degree at the University of Zurich in spring 1955 and immediately joined the petroleum industry. Following three years of fieldwork and well sitting in Israel, Madagascar and the Algerian Sahara with American and French oil companies, he joined Shell Canada in Calgary. For six years he was engaged in the exploration of the Cordilleran foothills of British Columbia, the Northwest Territories and the Yukon, as well as of the Pacific shelf. This involved extensive helicopter-supported fieldwork. In view of a growing family, he converted from a structurally oriented field-geologist to a more sedentary, stratigraphic trap hunting subsurface-geologist and chalked-up his first natural gas discoveries in the Alberta down-dip reef belt. After guiding an airborne excursion through the Cordillera during the 1967 Devonian Symposium of Calgary, his guidebook, summarizing “The Development of Sedimentary Basins in Western and Arctic Canada”, was published by the Alberta Society of Petroleum Geologists in 1969.

Ziegler was transferred to Shell International in the Netherlands on 1 January 1970, where he supervised Shell's exploration activities in the North Sea area. As the North Sea success story unfolded, Shell and its partners were rewarded with numerous important oil and gas discoveries, including the giant Brent, Statfjord, and Troll fields. Ziegler's responsibilities as exploration adviser expanded stepwise to all Shell companies in Europe, then South America, and ultimately worldwide.

Parallel to his operational responsibilities, Ziegler compiled regional geological data to gain a better understanding of the hydrocarbon potential of hitherto little explored basins on the Atlantic seaboard and of basins behind the Iron Curtain. Presentations at various conferences and symposia prompted academia to propose to Shell to publish his set of palaeogeographic/palaeotectonic maps. In 1982 Ziegler's Geological Atlas of Western and Central Europe was published. In this volume he retraced the geological history, depositional environments and tectonics of Europe north of the Alps in greater detail than had ever been done before.  In the same line, the American Association of Petroleum Geologists invited Ziegler to tour the United States and Canada in 1986-1987 as distinguished lecturer, speaking on the Evolution of the Arctic-North Atlantic and Western Tethys.

He died on 19 July 2013 in Binningen, Switzerland.

Scientific career
In autumn 1988 Ziegler retired from Shell and returned with his wife to Switzerland where he joined the University of Basel as lecturer. In short succession he published with Shell's support in late 1988 the AAPG Memoir 43, entitled “Evolution of the Arctic-North Atlantic and Western Tethys”, in 1989 a volume published by the Royal Geological and Mining Society of the Netherlands on “Evolution of Laurussia - A Study in Late Palaeozoic Plate Tectonics” and in 1990 for Shell's 100 years of Exploration Jubilee the 2nd edition of his “Geological Atlas of Western and Central Europe”. In addition he carried out consulting work, lectured regularly on Shell's behalf at the Vrije Universiteit Amsterdam, and participated in international research endeavors, such as the International Lithosphere Program (leader of working group 3: Intra-Plate Tectonics 1985-90: Bureau member 1991-94), EUROPROBE (1990–2002), the IGCP-369 Comparative evolution of Peri-Tethyan Rift Basins Project (1994–99) and the TRANSMED Atlas Project (2000–04). He initiated and coordinated the transnational EUCOR-URGENT Project (1999–2008) that dealt with the evolution and neotectonics of the Upper Rhine Graben. He contributed materially to the development of the follow-up TOPO-EUROPE Project, which addresses the neotectonic and topographic evolution of Europe.

Ziegler published widely in international journals and in thematic volumes on processes controlling extensional and compressional intraplate tectonics and on the evolution of the lithosphere. His publications found wide recognition and contributed enormously to narrowing the gap between academia and the industry. His work changed the way geologists look at depositional systems and tectonic processes controlling the evolution of sedimentary basins.

Awards
In 1992 Ziegler was appointed as Honorary Lecturer at University of Basel and in 1996 as Titular Professor for Global Geology. He was awarded Honorary Doctor Degrees by the Moscow State University (1997) and the Technical University Delft (2001). He was a recipient of the Foumarier medal of the Belgian Geological Society, the van Waterschot van der Gracht medal of the Royal Geological and Mining Society of the Netherlands, the William Smith medal of the Geological Society of London, the Neville George medal of the Geological Society of Glasgow, the Stephan Müller medal of the European Geosciences Union, the Leopold von Buch medal of the German Geological Society and the Leonidovici Kaptsa medal of the Russian Academy of Natural Sciences. From the American Association of Petroleum Geologists he received the Robert Dott sr. Memorial Award for the publication of his Memoir 43, and later the Special Commendation Award for his regional synthesis of the geological evolution of Europe and for being a lively catalyst of the dialogue among Earth Scientists.

Memberships
Ziegler was elected a foreign member of the Royal Netherlands Academy of Arts and Sciences in 1984. He became a member of the Academia Europaea in 1990. Ziegler was also a member of the Polish Academy of Arts and Sciences and the Russian Academy of Natural Sciences. He was a life member of the Bureau of the International Lithosphere Program and an honorary member of the Geological Society of London, the European Geosciences Union, the Geological Society of Poland and the American Association of Petroleum Geologists.

Honours
On the occasion of his 80th birthday the Swiss Geological Society honoured Ziegler with a symposium on the theme “Deep Earth - from Crust to Core”, held in Lugano on 23 November 2008.

Selected publications

References 

 
 
 Peter Ziegler's profile at the University of Basel

External links
 The International Lithosphere Program
 The EUROPROBE Program
 The TRANSMED Project
 The EUCOR-URGENT Project
 The TOPO-EUROPE Project

1928 births
2013 deaths
Members of Academia Europaea
Members of the Royal Netherlands Academy of Arts and Sciences
People from Winterthur
20th-century Swiss geologists
University of Zurich alumni
Academic staff of the University of Basel